Codex Vaticanus 1026 is a manuscript of the treatise On the Soul of Aristotle. It is designated by symbol W. Paleographically it had been assigned to the 13th century. It is written in Greek minuscule letters. The manuscript contains a complete text of the treatise. 

The Greek text of the manuscript is eclectic. It belongs to the textual family μ to II book, 7 chapter, 419 a 27. Since 419 a 27 it is a representative of the family κ.

The manuscript was not cited by Trendelenburg, Torstrik, Biehl, Apelt, and Ross in his critical editions of the treatise On the Soul. It means the manuscript has not high value. Currently it is housed at the Vatican Library (gr. 1026) at Rome.

Other manuscripts 

 Codex Vaticanus 253
 Codex Vaticanus 260
 Codex Coislinianus 386
 Codex Ambrosianus 435

Notes

Further reading 

 Paweł Siwek, Aristotelis tractatus De anima graece et latine, Desclée, Romae 1965. 

Manuscripts of the Vatican Library
13th-century manuscripts
Aristotelian manuscripts